Massacre Mania is an Italian 1967 science fiction film written and directed by Paolo Bianchini.

Plot

Cast 
  Robert Woods as Henry Spengler  
  Rada Rassimov as Nicole Bouvier  
 Ken Wood as  Inspector Griffith
  Fernando Sancho as Professor Kenitz
  Lino Coletta  as Maurice
  Piero Gerlini as The Policeman
  Nino Vingelli

Production
Massacre Mania was the third and final film directed by Paolo Bianchini for producer Gabriele Crisanti, following The Devil's Man and Superargo and the Faceless Giants. 
The film was shot in eight weeks in and around Rome between February and March 1967.

Among the cast was Robert Woods.  Woods described the script as improvized, stating that "these were nearly always collaborative efforts (where almost everyone involved had input)." Woods spoke positively about working on the film, specifically on how it was a departure from the Westerns and that he "loved the comic book implications" of Massacre Mania.

Style
In his book about Italian films inspired by comic books and their conventions, Roberto Curti described the film as "often labelled as a spy flick, Massacre Mania is actually a lot closer to the superhero films of the era, of which it represents a darker version, and very Italian too." Curti felt the film was a "strange mixture of science fiction, thriller and comic-book style adventure"

Release and reception
Massacre Mania was submitted to the Italian board of censors in October 1967, one month after Superargo and the Faceless Giants, but was eventually released earlier than that film. The Italian title for the film is Hipnos follia di massacro and is sometimes misspelled as Hypnos in reference books. Producer Gabriele Crisanti described the film's release as "a flop", acknowledging that he "made the mistake of giving it to a distributor-Vecchioni, the owner of United International Films-who went bankrupt before the film was released."

Director Paolo Bianchini did not have a high opinion of the film, stating that he had been "invited to conventions and film schools concerning [Massacre Mania]. But every time I watch it again, it's such a terrible thing. Perhaps people notice that there's a certain high craft about these pics, as they were literally made out of nothing."

See also

 List of Italian films of 1967
 List of science fiction films of the 1960s

References

Footnotes

Sources

External links

1960s Italian-language films
Italian science fiction films
1960s science fiction films
Films directed by Paolo Bianchini
Films shot in Rome
1960s Italian films